Lee Robertson (born 25 August 1973) is a Scottish former professional footballer.

Robertson began his career with Rangers making three league appearances for the club. He was released from his contract and moved to Norway with IK Start. He had spells with Molde FK and FK Bodø/Glimt and also a seven-day trial at St Johnstone in December 1999. Unfortunately heavy snow meant he left without even playing a bounce match for Saints.

He returned to IK Start and then moved to Australia. He went back to Scotland in 2003, but soon moved to Australia.

References

External links
2001 Profile

1973 births
Living people
Scottish footballers
Association football midfielders
Rangers F.C. players
IK Start players
Molde FK players
FK Bodø/Glimt players
Greenock Morton F.C. players
Scottish expatriate footballers
Expatriate footballers in Norway
Scottish Football League players
Eliteserien players
Scotland under-21 international footballers
Footballers from Edinburgh